Gu Xiaobo (1912 – 22 August 2006) was a Chinese diplomat who served as Ambassador to Sudan, Benin and Jordan.

 From April 1952 to April 1955 he was vice-chairman of the Tianjin Municipality Trade Union.
 In May 1953 he was member of the executive committee of the All-China Federation of Trade Unions.
 In August 1955 he was chairman of the Tianjin Municipality Trade Union.
 From July 1958 to 1960 he was vice-chairman of the Trade Union of Hebei Prov..
 From October 1958 to December 1964 he was deputy for Hebei to the 2nd National People's Congress.
 In 1959 he was vice-presisdent of the Tianjin University of Radio & TV.
 From July 1962 to December 1965 he was ambassador to Khartoum Sudan
 From June 1965 to January 1966 he was ambassador to Cotonou (Benin).
 From December 1977 to April 1982 he was ambassador to Amman (Jordan).

Gu Xiaobo died in Beijing on 22 August 2006.

References

1912 births
2006 deaths
Delegates to the 2nd National People's Congress
Ambassadors of China to Sudan
Ambassadors of China to Benin
Ambassadors of China to Jordan